Fort la Latte, or the Castle of the Rock Goyon, is a castle in the northeast of Brittany, about  southeast of Cap Fréhel and about  west of Saint-Malo, in the commune of Plévenon, Côtes-d'Armor.

It is a famous tourist attraction of the bay of Saint-Malo and the Emerald Coast (France) Côte d'Émeraude. This impressive castle was built on a small piece of land at the Bay of the Fresnay in the 14th century. Various films have been shot at this site, including The Vikings (1958) by Richard Fleischer with Kirk Douglas and Tony Curtis. It also features in the French band Manau's video for "La Tribu de Dana."  A much larger, fictionalized version of the fort appears in the 2015 animated film April and the Extraordinary World.

Historical 

The castle of the Roche Goyon has been classified as a monument historique by the French Ministry of Culture since 1925.

The castle was built in the 14th century by the Lord of Matignon, Etienne III Gouÿon. The construction of the castle began in the 1340s, its keep dates from the years 1365–1370.

In 1379, following the return from exile of the Duke of Brittany Jean IV, the castle was besieged by Bertrand Du Guesclin. The castle was attacked and taken a second time during the Wars of Religion in the sixteenth century, this defeat marking a time of abandonment of the building. It was not until the 18th century, under Louis XIV, that the castle resumed its strategic interest and was bastioned.

It was in service until the end of the First Empire when the evolution of military techniques led to its unsuitability. From 1892, it was sold to various private owners before being bought by the historian Frédéric Joüon Des Longrais in 1931 who, having a lifelong passion for archeology, undertook heavy restoration work which took more than twenty years.

Electricity only arrived at the castle in 2015.

Location 

The fort can be found on a rocky cape, near Cap Fréhel, in the town of Plévenon.

This site was chosen because of its favorable location - being difficult for an enemy to attack due to the lack of easy access and, in addition to it offering clear views of the English Channel the Emerald Coast and a large part of the Bay of St-Malo to provide warning of an approaching enemy, the cliffs on which it is built gave excellent protection from any attempted invasion from the sea.

Construction materials were easily accessible: with granite coming from the heart of Brittany, sandstone being directly recovered from the surrounding cliffs there are traces of old quarries on the coast, whose connection to the castle is revealed by toponyms such as "Port Taillé" which can be found on the cadastre and wood was in plentiful supply from the many forests which existed nearby in medieval times.

The fort was an important strategic point since it was not far from the trade routes connecting Saint-Malo, Normandy and the Channel Islands.

Events 

Albert II, Prince of Monaco made a private visit to the castle, July 5, 2012, in the footsteps of his ancestors the Goyon Matignon.

Festival 

Since the castle opened to the public, the owners, the Joüon Des Longrais family have shared the area with visitors through various events:

- The Celtic nights of castle from 2006 to 2007 (storytelling evening with music)

- 'Les Médiévales du Fort La Latte' - a medieval festival organized in August every year since 2008, which includes mediaeval stallholders, jousting tournaments and falconry displays as well as a smaller medieval event every two years.

Description 

The castle is provided with two gatehouses, one opening onto the barbican, the other onto the courtyard of the castle; each has its own drawbridge. In the courtyard, there is a water tank, a chapel, various defensive features and installations (in particular the locations of the gun batteries) and of course the keep.

On the way to the castle, there is a small menhir which, according to legend, is "the tooth" or "the finger" of Gargantua.

Barbican 

The Barbican is protected by a  portcullis and stout wooden door. The first gatehouse of the barbican is provided with a drawbridge which has been restored to working order. At the time of its construction in the fourteenth century, it was also protected by a portcullis and a double-leaf door. Completely destroyed by cannon shot during the second capture of the castle, it was subsequently rebuilt.

In front of this first gatehouse a battering ram and a pillory can be found.
Within the barbican is a small medieval garden, a "Bricole" (a kind of catapult) and one gains a panoramic view of the bay of St Malo.

The courtyard 

The courtyard contains several installations, such as the water cistern, the chapel (built during Louis XIV's reign), the governor's house and the keep. Completely backfilled in the 17th century in order that cannons may be used, the original medieval soil is up to eight metres below the modern-day surface. Archaeological excavations have revealed a square tower which probably served as a watchtower which has been entirely buried underground. A second building protects the courtyard under which a dungeon can be found. This building is also protected by a drawbridge and portcullis. Only the two medieval towers remain as the rest (in particular the upper floor) were destroyed by cannon in the sixteenth century. The drawbridges of the two gatehouses are not on the same axis in order to hinder the manoeuvering of battering rams.

The cistern 

The water cistern, with a capacity of 20,000 L, was expected to have been sufficient to serve the entire garrison (about forty men) although given the maximum retention volume seems limited. A rainwater recovery system was put in place.
On the same level of the tank, a dummy drawbridge was intended to deceive any maritime attackers who would be deceived into sailing onwards an area of strong currents where their ship would then be at risk of smashing against the rocks. This dummy drawbridge was, however, ineffective.

The cannons 
Eight cannons were installed during the reign of Louis XIV, the largest being eight metres long. Today, only "medium" copies are present on the site, but which could still shoot a ball up to a kilometre. Ballistic adjustments were made by use of the runway - a granite circle on which the cannon were placed and guided the wheels of the gun as it was manoeuvered into position.

According to military records, one shot could be fired every three minutes.

Oven to 'Blush' the balls 

The Chateau of the Roche Goyon also has a ball oven for heating cannonballs so that they were 'red-hot' prior to firing. The oven and method were rarely used however, for several reasons:

 the oven consumed a lot of wood;
 for this to be effective, it had to heat for eight hours, which gave the enemies plenty of time to flee;
 loading the cannon proved much more dangerous as the hot ball could cause to pre-ignite the black powder before the cannon could be properly fired.

The use of ball ovens resulted in the coining of the expression "Tirer à boulets rouges" ("To shoot with red balls") meaning a particularly vehement attack on, or criticism of, an opponent.

The keep 

The keep is equipped with machicolations and several types of loopholes: the crossbowmen in the shape of a cross for crossbow shooting and the very long single slit archeries for archery. Smaller Holes located on each side of the loopholes for shooting arquebus and larger holes through which bombard could be fired. A line of bombardment is visible at the level of these loopholes and corresponds to the capture of the castle in the sixteenth century which was accompanied by a cannonade from the keep.

Four sculptures representing the tetramorph according to Ezekiel are found at the level of the yellow granite circle which surrounds the keep. Here, facing the castle, can be found the angel of Saint Matthew, then the lion of Saint Mark, the eagle of Saint John (severely eroded) and finally the bull of Saint Luke to the right of the entrance to the keep .

The entrance to the keep reveals the presence of a third drawbridge, now replaced by a staircase. The emblem of the Goyon-Matignon family, a siren, crowns the passage. The entrance to the keep was protected by a portcullis and a defensive entrapment perhaps best described as a kind of 'mousetrap'. In the keep there is an exhibition on the restoration works of the castle and the roof is  supported by a cross vault of ogives dating from 1340.

The menhir of La Latte 

On the path leading to the castle stands the menhir of La Latte ('Doigt de Gargantua' According to legend, at a time when humans and Korrigans lived amongst each other, they were terrorised by giants. Human and Korrigan joined forces and the humans baited the giants in to falling into a trap where they were destroted by the Korrigans. Gargantua was one such giant who was struck down on Cape Fréhel. Consequently, the islets that are found in the sea are believed to be pieces of his body and the menhir his raised his finger protruding from the ground at Fort La Latte. Other features are variously described as being the hooves and cane of Gargantua.

bibliography 

 La Châtelaine aux deux visages, by Simone Roger-Vercel, 1957
 Le Jeu du Roi, by Jean Raspail, 1976
 Le Fantôme de Fort La Latte, comics strip from "Aventures de Vick et Vicky" by Bruno Bertin by Éditions P'tit Louis, 2007
 Le Fort La Latte, by Isabelle Joüon Des Longrais by éditions Ouest-France, juin 2009
 Le Chemin de Malefosse, comics strip by Daniel Bardet and Brice Goepfert, by éditions Glénat, 2015
 Christophe Amiot, Le fort La Latte, anciennement Roche Goyon, in French Archaeological congress. 173rd session. Monuments of Côtes-d'Armor. « Le Beau Moyen Âge ». 2015, French Archaeological Society, 2017, p. 97-110,
 Sekijô No Shi, Le Château de la Roche Goyon dit Fort la Latte, imprimerie de la Manutention, 1973,
 Le secret de Fort La Latte, by Valérie Thiébaut published by Héros d'Armor, 1er décembre 2017.

Filmography 

This castle served as a setting for several scenes from the following films, television films, television series and clips :

 The perfume of the lady in black, 1931
 The Three Musketeers, 1948
 The Vikings (Vikings) 1958, with Kirk Douglas, whose final fight took place on the keep.
 Metzengerstein one of the sketches from the film Extraordinary Stories, 1967.
 Lancelot du Lac, 1970.
 The Dance of Death, 1983.
 Chouans!, French film 1987.
 The King's Game, 1988.
 Ridiculous, 1996.
 The heart and the Sword (Il cuore e la spada, Heart and Sword) 1998.
 La Tribu de Dana, clip from the French band Manau, 1998.
 TV advertising for the search engine "Lycos" 2000
 Une vieille maîtresse, French film 2007.
 L'Épervier, the series for France Télévision with Aurélien Wiik, Martin Lamotte 2011.
 Avril and the extraordinary world, animated film, 2015.
 Ma Reine, clip from the French band Manau, 2018.
 Tasnif-e magali Kurdi, clip from the French medieval band Soñj, 2018.

See also
 List of castles in France

References

External links

 Fort La Latte - Official site
Fort la Latte and Fréhal
 
 Dinan Cap-Fréhel tourism

Castles in Brittany
Monuments historiques of Côtes-d'Armor